Cagno is a comune (municipality) in the Province of Como in the Italian region Lombardy, located about  northwest of Milan and about  west of Como.

Cagno borders the following municipalities: Albiolo, Cantello, Malnate, Rodero, Solbiate, Valmorea.

References

External links
 Official website

Cities and towns in Lombardy